The  variation distance of two distributions  and  over a finite domain , (often referred to as statistical difference

or statistical distance  in cryptography) is defined as 

.

References

See also
   Zero-knowledge proof
   Randomness extractor

Cryptography